Alun Gruffydd Thomas (3 February 1926 – 8 May 1991) was a rugby union centre from Cwmavon who played international rugby for  Wales between 1952 and 1955. He studied at UCW Aberystwyth and played for the college first team and the newly founded Rugby Club.

At club level he represented Cardiff, Swansea and Llanelli, and was also selected for invitational tourists The Barbarians. In 1955 he toured with the British Lions in South Africa, playing in five games. He then managed the team 19 years later on the 1974 tour of South Africa. He won his first cap as a centre against England in Twickenham.

References

1926 births
1991 deaths
Alumni of Aberystwyth University
Barbarian F.C. players
British & Irish Lions rugby union players from Wales
Cardiff RFC players
Llanelli RFC players
Llangennech RFC players
People educated at Port Talbot County Boys' Grammar School
Rugby union centres
Rugby union players from Cwmavon, Neath Port Talbot
Swansea RFC players
Wales international rugby union players
Wales Rugby Union officials
Welsh rugby union players